The chapters of the Japanese manga series Black Lagoon are written and illustrated by Rei Hiroe and published in Shogakukan's seinen manga magazine Monthly Sunday Gene-X since April 19, 2002. As of August 19, 2021, twelve tankōbon volumes have been released.

The in North American English-language release of the manga is controlled by Viz Media, who published the first volume on August 12, 2008.

A spin-off about Sawyer, titled , illustrated by Tatsuhiko Ida, began in Monthly Sunday Gene-X on September 19, 2019.



Volume list

Chapters not yet in tankōbon format
 110: "L'homme sombre - Part 9" [aka The Dark Man]
 111: "L'homme sombre - Part 10" [aka The Dark Man]
 112: "L'homme sombre - Part 11" [aka The Dark Man]
 113: "L'homme sombre - Part 12" [aka The Dark Man]
 114: "New Girl in the Hood"

Sōjiya Sawyer – Kaitai! Gore Gore Musume

Eda -Initial Stage-

Chapters not yet in tankōbon format
 8: "Balkan Crisis - Part 1"
 9: "Balkan Crisis - Part 2"

References

Chapters
Black Lagoon